The 2014 Catalan motorcycle Grand Prix was the seventh round of the 2014 MotoGP season. It was held at the Circuit de Barcelona-Catalunya in Montmeló on 15 June 2014. Enea Bastianini took his first podium finish in the Moto3 class in what was just his 7th race.

Classification

MotoGP

Moto2

Moto3

Championship standings after the race (MotoGP)
Below are the standings for the top five riders and constructors after round seven has concluded.

Riders' Championship standings

Constructors' Championship standings

 Note: Only the top five positions are included for both sets of standings.

References

Catalan Grand Prix
Catalan Motorcycle Grand Prix
motorcycle
Catalan motorcycle Grand Prix
Catalan motorcycle Grand Prix